Carl Bridge (born 1950) is an Australian historian, academic, and professor emeritus of Australian History at King's College London.

Biography
Carl Bridge is a graduate of the University of Sydney and Flinders University. He taught at Flinders and the University of New England, and was director of the Menzies Centre for Australian Studies, King's College London from 1997 to 2014. He has been a fellow of Clare Hall, Cambridge; Churchill College, Cambridge; the Australian Prime Ministers' Centre; and the National Library of Australia. He is also a fellow of the Royal Historical Society. Bridge is a former co-editor of London Papers in Australian Studies and Reviews in Australian Studies. He often speaks and writes on Australian matters in the British and international media. He is currently co-editing a volume of the Documents on Australian Foreign Policy series, on Australia in Peace and War, 1914–19.

Selected publications
Revolution: A History of the Idea. London: Croom Helm, 1985. (Edited with David Close).
Holding India to the Empire: the British Conservative Party and the 1935 Constitution. New Delhi: Sterling; London: Oriental, 1986.
A Trunk Full of Books: A History of the State Library of South Australia and its forerunners. Adelaide: Wakefield, 1986.
Munich to Vietnam: Australia's Relations with Britain and the United States since the 1930s. Melbourne: Melbourne University Press, 1991. (Edited).
Manning Clark: Essays on his Place in History. Melbourne: Melbourne University Press, 1994. (Edited).
Between Empire and Nation: Australia's External Relations from Federation to the Second World War. Melbourne: Australian Scholarly, 2000. (Edited with Bernard Attard).
The British World: Diaspora, Culture, Identity. London: Frank Cass, 2003. (Edited with Kent Fedorowich).
A Delicate Mission: The Washington Diaries of R. G. Casey, 1940–42. Canberra: National Library of Australia, 2008. (Edited).
William Hughes: Australia. London: Haus Publishing, 2011.
Australia and the United Kingdom 1960–1975. Canberra: Department of Foreign Affairs and Trade, 2010. (Edited with S.R. Ashton & Stuart Ward)
The High Commissioners. Australia’s Representatives in the United Kingdom, 1910–2010. Canberra: Department of Foreign Affairs & Trade, 2010. (Edited with Frank Bongiorno & David Lee).
Australia Goes to Washington: 75 years of Australian representation in the United States, 1940–2015. Canberra:  ANU Press, 2016. Edited with David Lowe and David Lee).

References

External links
Carl Bridge at academia.edu
Spearing the Governor. Natural History Museum

Academics of King's College London
Living people
People from Sydney
Flinders University alumni
Fellows of the Royal Historical Society
University of Sydney alumni
Academic staff of the University of New England (Australia)
Academic staff of Flinders University
1950 births